R. Nigel Horspool is a retired  professor of computer science, formerly of the University of Victoria. He invented the Boyer–Moore–Horspool algorithm, a fast string search algorithm adapted from the Boyer–Moore string-search algorithm. Horspool is co-inventor of dynamic Markov compression and was associate editor and then editor-at-large of the journal Software: Practice and Experience from 2007 to 2017. He is the author of C Programming in the Berkeley UNIX Environment.

Nigel Horspool is British by birth, but is now a citizen of Canada.
After a public school education at Monmouth School, he studied at Pembroke College, Cambridge, where he received a BA in natural science, but specializing in theoretical physics, in 1969.
After two years employment as an assembly language programmer on a partially successful air traffic control system project, he went to the University of Toronto for an MSc followed by a PhD in computer science.
This was followed by seven years as an assistant professor and then an associate professor at McGill University.
In 1983, he made a permanent move to the University of Victoria. As of July 2016, he retired from the university but retains the title of professor emeritus.

References

Canadian computer scientists
British computer scientists
Living people
Year of birth missing (living people)